Heart Healer (full title: Heart Healer: the Metal Opera by Magnus Karlsson) is the first studio album by metal opera project Heart Healer, formed by Swedish multi-instrumentalist Magnus Karlsson, released on 12 March 2021 via Frontiers Records.

The invited singers were:
 Adrienne Cowan (Seven Spires, Sascha Paeth's Masters of Ceremony, Avantasia, Winds of Plague)
 Ailyn (Her Chariot Awaits, ex-Sirenia)
 Anette Olzon (The Dark Element, ex-Nightwish)
 Margarita Monet (Edge of Paradise)
 Netta Laurenne (Smackbound, Laurenne/Louhimo)
 Noora Louhimo (Battle Beast, Laurenne/Louhimo)
 Youmna Jreissati (Ostura)

The album's plot follows the title character (performed by Cowan) after she wakes up with no memory and with the ability to heal people with the touch of her bare hands, though that comes at the gradual cost of her own strength. As the story progresses, she meets people willing to help her, use her powers or hunt her.

The album has been released on CD, color vinyl and digital formats. On 25 January 2021, a video for "Into the Unknown" was released.

Track listing

Charts

Personnel
Per source
 Magnus Karlsson - guitar, bass, keyboards
 Anders Köllerfors - drums
 Daniel Tengberg - cello
 Erika Sävström Engman - violin

Vocalists
 Adrienne Cowan (Seven Spires, Light & Shade, Masters of Ceremony, Winds of Plague, Avantasia (Live))
 Ailyn Gimenez (Trail of Tears, Her Chariot Awaits, Ex-Sirenia)
 Youmna Jreissati (Ostura)
 Netta Laurenne (Smackbound, Laurenne/Louhimo)
 Noora Louhimo (Battle Beast, Laurenne/Louhimo, Noora Louhimo Experience)
 Margarita Monet (Edge of Paradise)
 Anette Olzon (Anette Olzon, Allen/Olzon, The Dark Element, Alyson Avenue, Ex-Nightwish)

References

2021 albums
Rock operas
Frontiers Records albums